The facial artery (external maxillary artery in older texts) is a branch of the external carotid artery that supplies structures of the superficial face.

Structure 
The facial artery arises in the carotid triangle from the external carotid artery, a little above the lingual artery and, sheltered by the ramus of the mandible. It passes obliquely up beneath the digastric and stylohyoid muscles, over which it arches to enter a groove on the posterior surface of the submandibular gland.

It then curves upward over the body of the mandible at the antero-inferior angle of the masseter; passes forward and upward across the cheek to the angle of the mouth, then ascends along the side of the nose, and ends at the medial commissure of the eye, under the name of the angular artery.

The facial artery is remarkably tortuous.  This is to accommodate itself to neck movements such as those of the pharynx in deglutition; and facial movements such as those of the mandible, lips, and cheeks.

Relations 

In the neck, its origin is superficial, being covered by the integument, platysma, and fascia; it then passes beneath the digastric and stylohyoid muscles and part of the submandibular gland, but superficial to the hypoglossal nerve.

It lies upon the middle pharyngeal constrictor and the superior pharyngeal constrictor, the latter of which separates it, at the summit of its arch, from the lower and back part of the tonsil.

On the face, where it passes over the body of the mandible, it is comparatively superficial, lying immediately beneath the dilators of the mouth. In its course over the face, it is covered by the integument, the fat of the cheek, and, near the angle of the mouth, by the platysma, risorius, and zygomaticus major. It rests on the buccinator and levator anguli oris, and passes either over or under the infraorbital head of the levator labii superioris.

The anterior facial vein lies lateral/posterior to the artery, and takes a more direct course across the face, where it is separated from the artery by a considerable interval. In the neck it lies superficial to the artery.

The branches of the facial nerve cross the artery from behind forward.

The facial artery anastomoses with (among others) the dorsal nasal artery of the internal carotid artery.

Branches
The branches of the facial artery are:

 cervical
 Ascending palatine artery
 Tonsillar branch
 Submental artery
 Glandular branches
 facial
 Inferior labial artery
 Superior labial artery
 Lateral nasal branch to nasalis muscle
 Angular artery - the terminal branch

Muscles
Muscles supplied by the facial artery include: 
 buccinator
 levator anguli oris
 levator labii superioris
 levator labii superioris alaeque nasi
 levator veli palatini
 masseter
 mentalis
 mylohyoid
 nasalis
 palatoglossus
 palatopharyngeus
 platysma
 procerus
 risorius
 styloglossus
 transverse portion of the nasalis

Clinical significance 
The facial artery may be punctured during maxillofacial surgery, and is likely to haemorrhage significantly.

Additional images

See also
 Transverse facial artery

References

External links

 
  - "The Facial Artery and Vein"
  - "Branches of the external carotid artery."
  - "Common Carotid Artery and Branches of the External Carotid Artery"

Arteries of the head and neck
Artery